Candice Price may refer to:

 Candice Renee Price, American mathematician
 Candice Davis Price (b. 1984), American hurdler